Kabaté  is the main village (chef-lieu) of the  commune of Colimbiné in the Cercle of Kayes in the Kayes Region of south-western Mali.

References

Populated places in Kayes Region